Lick Log Creek is a stream in Bollinger and Wayne counties in the U.S. state of Missouri.

The stream source area is in extreme eastern Wayne County east of Lowndes. The stream flows to the northeast passing under Missouri Route E just west of Gipsy to its confluence with the Castor River just north of Gipsy.

Lick Log Creek was named for a salty log at a mineral lick which attracted deer.

See also
List of rivers of Missouri

References

Rivers of Bollinger County, Missouri
Rivers of Wayne County, Missouri
Rivers of Missouri